Yebin Mok (born April 19, 1984) is an American former competitive figure skater. She is the 2002 Golden Spin of Zagreb silver medalist, won two bronze medals on the ISU Junior Grand Prix circuit, and placed fifth at the 2003 World Junior Championships.

Personal life 
Mok was born on April 19, 1984 in Seoul, South Korea. She emigrated to the United States with her parents when she was seven.

Career 
Mok began skating in 1994 in Culver City, California. She won Junior Olympics in 1997 in Juvenile, and 1998 in Intermediate Ladies, which is equivalent to U.S Junior Nationals. A stress fracture in the summer of 1998 kept her off the ice for three months.

In October 2000, Mok made her Junior Grand Prix (JGP) debut, placing fourth in Germany before winning bronze in the Czech Republic. In November, she won a senior international medal – silver at the Golden Spin of Zagreb. Around 2000, she developed a pinched nerve in her back. She was selected to compete at the 2001 World Junior Championships in Sofia, Bulgaria. She placed tenth in her qualifying group but withdrew before the short program.

In the 2002–03 JGP series, Mok placed fourth in Montreal and won bronze in Beijing. She placed sixth on the senior level at the 2003 U.S. Championships and was sent to the 2003 World Junior Championships in Ostrava. She placed second in her qualifying group, fifth in the short program, sixth in the free skate, and fifth overall in the Czech Republic. Mok later missed five months of training due to a stress fracture in her lower back and then four months due to ganglion cysts on her ankles, which required surgery.

Mok did not compete in the 2005–06 season. She struggled with eating disorders, obsessive-compulsive disorder, and depression. In 2008, she became a professional skater for Holiday on Ice.

Programs

Competitive highlights

References

External links
 

1984 births
Living people
American female single skaters
American sportspeople of Korean descent
South Korean emigrants to the United States
Sportspeople from Greater Los Angeles
21st-century American women